Michael "Tack" Wilson (born May 16, 1955) is an American former professional baseball player. He played parts of two seasons in Major League Baseball (MLB) with the Minnesota Twins and California Angels in 1983 and 1987. Primarily an outfielder, he was most often used as a pinch runner, being used in that manner in eight out of his twelve career games played.

External links
, or Retrosheet
Pura Pelota (Venezuelan Winter League)

1955 births
Living people
Albuquerque Dukes players
Amarillo Dillas players
American expatriate baseball players in Canada
Baseball coaches from Louisiana
Baseball players from Shreveport, Louisiana
Bellingham Dodgers players
California Angels players
Clinton Dodgers players
Danville Dodgers players
Daytona Beach Explorers players
Denver Zephyrs players
Edmonton Trappers players
Grays Harbor Loggers players
Huntsville Stars players
Major League Baseball designated hitters
Major League Baseball outfielders
Minnesota Twins players
Minor league baseball coaches
Oklahoma City 89ers players
Phoenix Firebirds players
Phoenix Giants players
San Antonio Dodgers players
Tigres de Aragua players
American expatriate baseball players in Venezuela
Toledo Mud Hens players
Tulsa Drillers players
Visalia Oaks players